Guppy is a surname. Notable people with the surname include:

 Darius Guppy, public school fraudster
 Eileen Guppy (1903–1980), British geologist
 Henry B. Guppy (1854–1926), British botanist
 Henry Guppy (librarian) (1861–1948), British librarian
 John Guppy (1874–1937), fisherman, farmer and political figure in Newfoundland
 Lechmere Guppy (1836–1916), British naturalist; discoverer and namesake of the fish
 Sarah Guppy (1770–1852), British inventor
 Shusha Guppy (1935–2008), author, editor, singer and filmmaker
 Steve Guppy (born 1969), English retired footballer